Paliath Ravi Achan (born 12 March 1928) is a former Indian cricketer who represented Travancore-Cochin and Kerala in domestic first-class cricket. He was a right-handed batsman and right-arm medium-pacer.

Career
He is the eldest male member of the Paliam royal family of Cochin. He did his B.Sc. at the Annamalai University in Chidambaram. Achan's Ranji Trophy debut came for Travancore-Cochin against Mysore in Thiruvananthapuram in 1952. It was Travancore-Cochin's second-ever Ranji match. He scored 43 in the match and was the team's highest scorer. When the Travancore-Cochin cricket team was renamed Kerala in 1957, after the formation of Kerala state, Achan played for Kerala.

Ravi retired from domestic cricket at the age of 41. His career-high score is 70 which came in his last game against Madras in 1969, while his best bowling figures (6-34) came in 1960 against Andhra Pradesh. He also played in Tripunithura's Pooja tournament, one of the world's oldest limited-overs tournaments. Achan played 55 first-class matches for Travancore-Cochin and Kerala teams from 1952 to 1970. Primarily a leg-spinner, he took 125 wickets and scored 1107 runs. He was the first Kerala cricketer to complete the double of 1000 runs and 100 wickets. He also captained Kerala in several games. The best spin bowler award presented by the Kerala Cricket Association is named after him.

References

External links

1928 births
Indian cricketers
Kerala cricketers
Travancore-Cochin cricketers
Living people